"Step into Christmas" is a Christmas song written by English musician Elton John and songwriter Bernie Taupin, and performed by John. It was released as a stand-alone single in November 1973 with the song "Ho, Ho, Ho (Who'd Be a Turkey at Christmas)" as the B-side. Upon its original 1973 release, the song peaked at No. 24 on the UK Singles Chart, and it reached a new peak of No. 8 on the same chart in 2019. In the United States, the single reached No. 56 on the Cash Box Top 100 Singles chart and No. 1 on the Billboard Christmas Singles chart.

"Step into Christmas" was later included as a bonus track on the 1995 remastered reissue of the album Caribou, even though it was released in the Goodbye Yellow Brick Road era. It also appears on the albums Elton John's Christmas Party, Rare Masters, To Be Continued, Diamonds and various Christmas compilation albums. Two versions with different vocals are known to exist: the original single mix and a version recorded for John's 1973 performance of "Step into Christmas" on The Gilbert O'Sullivan Show television programme (which featured Bernie Taupin standing in for Ray Cooper on percussion).

In 2009, "Step into Christmas" was listed as the ninth-most-played Christmas song of the 2000s in the UK. In December 2021, the song was certified double platinum by the British Phonographic Industry for sales and streams of 1,200,000 units. In September 2021, the song was certified gold by the Recording Industry Association of America for sales and streams of 500,000 units.

Recording
According to liner notes about the song (in Rare Masters and Elton John's Christmas Party), the track and its B-side, both produced by Gus Dudgeon, were recorded during a session on 11 November 1973 at London's Morgan Studios, which was owned by drummer Barry Morgan, who had played on several of John's early albums. "Step into Christmas" was mixed to sound like one of producer Phil Spector's 1960s recordings, using plenty of compression and imitating his trademark wall of sound technique. This was intentional according to both John and Taupin, and an homage of sorts to Christmas songs by Spector-produced groups such as The Ronettes.

Music video
A music video was produced to promote the single; it is notable for its cameo appearance of Taupin, who is seen briefly playing tubular bells during the song's bridge (although they are actually played in the audio recording by percussionist Ray Cooper). John is also seen holding his Watford F.C. supporters card. John would later go on to own the club.

Chart performance

Charts

Certifications

Other versions
"Step into Christmas" was covered by the band The Wedding Present on their 1992 single "No Christmas" and also covered by The Business for the holiday EP Bollocks to Christmas. The song was also covered by The Puppini Sisters on their 2010 holiday album Christmas with The Puppini Sisters.

Notes

References

1973 singles
British Christmas songs
Elton John songs
Songs with music by Elton John
Songs with lyrics by Bernie Taupin
Song recordings produced by Gus Dudgeon
DJM Records singles
MCA Records singles
Song recordings with Wall of Sound arrangements